Our Daily Bread is a devotional calendar-style booklet published by Our Daily Bread Ministries (formerly RBC Ministries) in over 55 languages.
The booklet is one of the most widely read Christian devotionals in circulation today. It was first published in April 1956, and includes writing about the Bible and insights into Christian living. The booklet's title originates from a line of the Lord's Prayer.

The contents include a Bible passage, and a relevant article for each day of the year. It is written by a different author each day, and also features additional Bible passages for people following Our Daily Bread's "Bible In One Year" reading program.

References

External links
 

Christian devotional literature
Magazines published in Michigan
Monthly magazines published in the United States
Online magazines published in the United States
1956 establishments in the United States
Christian magazines
Magazines established in 1956
Religious magazines published in the United States